River Rock Casino Resort in Richmond, British Columbia is the largest casino in the province of British Columbia. The casino is owned by Great Canadian Gaming. The hotel has a total of 396 rooms, including standard rooms and suites and it is situated on the river with a 144-berth marina.

The casino has 10,000 visitors per day on average and generated an annual revenue of $244 million as of August 2006.

History
The casino was built on the site of the former Bridgepoint Market in Richmond. It first opened to the public on June 25, 2004.
Several variances were needed from the City of Richmond to allow it to open with service that customers expect. This included a modification of its liquor licence and operating licence to allow liquor to be consumed in the casino's theatre.

It hosted the British Columbia Poker Championships in November 2005, 2006 and 2007. The premier event of the Johnny Chan Poker Championship was also held in 2007.

The 2006 Gemini Awards were presented at the River Rock Casino Resort, marking the ceremony's West Coast debut; the event is normally held in Toronto.

The grand atrium of the resort also contains the first spiral escalators to ever be installed in Canada.

Transportation
The casino is served by Bridgeport Station on the Canada Line SkyTrain, located across from the casino.

Bus service, operated by TransLink, is provided via bus routes within walking distance of the casino.

The casino is located about five minutes from Vancouver International Airport, on Richmond's Sea Island. It is also near Highway 99, the main highway connecting Vancouver to the southern suburbs.

The casino also plans to build a 1,200 parking space complex for casino patrons and for park-and-ride transit use.
The 1,200 stall parkade will cost $33 million to build. TransLink (the Canada Line Operator) will give the Great Canadian Casino Corporation land worth $9.5 million, and $4.5 million in cash in return for building the park-and-ride facility. Transit users will be charged $2.50 to use the facility.

River Rock Casino and the film industry
Because the Vancouver area has a big film industry, River Rock has played host to various productions looking for casino filming locations. While this is generally well received, there have been some unfortunate incidents. On 8 November 2006, three photographers made their way onto a closed section of the hotel's balcony intending to photograph actress Denise Richards during filming of the movie Blonde and Blonder. In an ensuing argument, she allegedly threw a laptop computer belonging to one photographer off the balcony, striking the arm of an elderly lady in a wheelchair.

The casino was also prominently featured in the Psych episode entitled "Speak Now or Forever Hold Your Piece."

Loan sharking controversy
A report released by the British Columbia Lottery Corporation showed that out of 56 incidents of a casino patron in British Columbia being barred from gambling for suspected loan sharking activity, 34 of those incidents took place at River Rock.
Controversy within Richmond was further stirred when the RCMP admitted it could do little to stop loan sharking unless a victim came forward, yet it was the suspected motive for a variety of kidnappings, extortions, threats and violence.
The most prominent case occurred when Rong Lilly Li, a suspected loan shark, disappeared after last being seen getting into a van outside the casino on 26 May 2006. Her body was finally recovered on the weekend of 9–10 September 2006.

An June 2016 audit found that the casino knowingly allowed high rollers to buy chips with funds from lenders with anti-money laundering restrictions who were being investigated by the Royal Canadian Mounted Police.

Concerts and pageants
Miss Chinese (Vancouver) Pageant have been hosted at the casino venue in 2009 and has been used as venue for Cantopop stars from Hong Kong for their North American tours.

See also
 List of casinos in Canada

References

External links

Buildings and structures in Richmond, British Columbia
Casinos in British Columbia
Casinos completed in 2004